The Nigerian Queen –  abbreviated as TNQ and also known as Miss Grand Nigeria –  is an annual Nigerian beauty pageant. Formerly known as Queen of Trust, TNQ is organised by 001 Entertainment. Since 2021, TNQ representatives have competed at Miss Grand International.

The current titleholder is fashion model and former MBGN and Miss Nigeria finalist Damilola Bolarinde, who represented Lagos.

History
001 Entertainment president, Kelvin Joseph Amroma, established Queen of Trust in 2009, with the first edition held in Port Harcourt. Winners adopt a platform (Known in Nigerian pageants as 'pet project') during their reign – an issue of interest affecting society, and once chosen, they use their status to address the public regarding their platform. In 2015, halfway through the winner's reign, Queen of Trust was renamed The Nigerian Queen, with 2014's titleholder Onyeka Agu named deputy national director. In 2020, for the first time in the pageant's 11-year history, the TNQ final was held in Lagos instead of Port Harcourt.

Competition
As with most major Nigerian pageants, TNQ comprises various segments including local costume, evening gown, and interview. Preliminaries are held before the grand final, and both fashion and talent shows are included. Prior to 2016, contestants wore their first names on their sashes to reflect their individual personalities (Between 2013 and 2014, famous football player names were used), but each girl now represents a state, with more than one contestant occasionally acting as state delegate. Unlike other pageants with strict rules regarding vital statistics, plus-sized have also competed. 

The most consistent awards at the TNQ finale are Best Dinner Gown, Best Local Costume (formerly Best Traditional Attire), Miss Popularity, Miss Photogenic, Most Talented, Top Model, and Nigerian Queen Multimedia. Other awards have included Miss Sportswoman and Miss Amity.

Prizes for the winner and runners-up vary each year; as of 2018 the winner receives a Hyundai car, 700 square metres of land, ₦1,000,000, and a trip to Dubai. According to the pageant's president Kelvin Joseph Amroma, during TNQ's first edition, the star prize was a television.

Titleholders

Early era: Queen of Trust

Current era: The Nigerian Queen

Notes

Winners by State

Other notable contestants
Ada Eme - MBGN 2022

TNQ International Representatives 
Color keys

Miss Grand International 
After 001 Entertainment acquired the rights to send delegates to Miss Grand International, Chikaodili Nna-Udosen became TNQ's first Miss Grand representative in 2020. The following year, TNQ runner-up Patience Christopher became the first Nigerian to place at the international pageant.

Miss Eco International 
In 2021, TNQ acquired the right to send representatives to Miss Eco International. Queen Joy Omanibe, who had placed second runner-up in TNQ, became the first Nigerian to place at the international pageant.

Scandal
In 2016, Cynthia Ugbah resigned from her position as reigning TNQ after accusing organisers 001 Entertainment of sexual harassment. In a statement Ugbah stated "They wanted me to sleep with men for money and then given the money to them to better their own organisation. Apparently that's how it works. They are rogues, thieves, fake, and most of all broke, they need pretty girls to fetch them money." However, the organisation argued these were false claims, and Ugbah had been dethroned due to gross misconduct.

See also

 Miss Nigeria
 Most Beautiful Girl in Nigeria
 Miss Earth Nigeria
 Mr Nigeria

References

External links
 

Nigeria
Beauty pageants in Nigeria
2009 establishments in Nigeria
Nigerian awards